The Fighting Tailor is a 1926 short comedy silent film directed by Philadelphian director, Benjamin Stoloff starring George Harris and Barbara Luddy.

External links

1926 films
American silent short films
Films directed by Benjamin Stoloff
1926 short films
Silent American comedy films
American black-and-white films
American comedy short films
1926 comedy films
1920s American films